Kahit Kailan (International title: Always / ) is a Philippine television drama romance series broadcast by GMA Network. Directed by Ruel S. Bayani, it stars Jolina Magdangal. It premiered on May 5, 2002, replacing Anna Karenina. The series concluded on July 6, 2003, with a total of 62 episodes. It was replaced by Love to Love.

Cast and characters

Lead cast
 Jolina Magdangal as Frankie

Supporting cast
 James Blanco as Victor
 Danica Sotto as Alex
 Dennis Trillo as Jaime
 Roxanne Barcelo as Eden
 Biboy Ramirez as Luis
 Sunshine Dizon as Bettina aka Betchay
 Nancy Castiglione as Abby
 Maybelyn Dela Cruz as Rosette
 Paolo Ballesteros as PJ
 Miko Sotto as Itos
 Ina Feleo as Lira
 Mike Olivarez as Ricky
 Christian Vasquez as Carlo
 Greg Turvey as Russel
 Jeff Geronimo as Ray

Guest cast
 Gina Pareño as Doña Candida Sanpiandante
 Rita Avila as Dolores
 Amy Austria
 Odette Khan
 Maritoni Fernandez as Lusing
 Carmi Martin as Dolce Vita
 Tootsie Guevara as Rafaella
 Roy Alvarez
 Jan Marini Alano as Tuding
 Gerard Pizaras
 Iya Villania as Marjorie
 Brad Turvey
 Migui Moreno
 Teri Onor
 Charlie Davao
 Allan Paule as Daniel
 Czarina de Leon
 Geoff Eigenmann
 Daniel Fernando
 Ricardo Cepeda

External links
 

2002 Philippine television series debuts
2003 Philippine television series endings
2000s teen drama television series
Filipino-language television shows
GMA Network drama series
Philippine romance television series
Television shows set in the Philippines